A manta ray is a large ray belonging to the genus Manta.

Manta Ray or Mantaray may also refer to:

 Manta (platform), a South Korean digital comics platform
 Manta Ray (film), a 2018 Thai film
 Manta Ray (album), a 1994 album by Nan Vernon
 Mantaray (album), a 2007 album by Siouxsie
 "Manta Ray" (song), a 2015 song by J. Ralph
 "Manta Rays", a 2020 song by Chloe Moriondo
Manta Ray (Transformers), a character from Transformers: Generation 2
 Manta Ray, a development of Mako Shark (concept car)
 The Mantaray (show rod), a customized car built in 1963

See also 
 Manta (disambiguation)